Mauricio Javier Salazar Durán (born 21 September 1979) is a Chilean retired footballer as striker.

An idol of Deportes La Serena, he was nicknamed Ingeniero ( Engineer). Similarly, he received as mining engineer at the University of La Serena.

References

External links
 
 Salazar at Football Lineups

1979 births
Living people
Chilean footballers
Deportes La Serena footballers
University of La Serena alumni 
Audax Italiano footballers
C.D. Huachipato footballers
Chilean Primera División players
Association football forwards
People from La Serena